Year 1339 (MCCCXXXIX) was a common year starting on Friday (link will display the full calendar) of the Julian calendar.

Events 
 January–December 
 June – Battle of Laupen: The Canton of Bern defeats the forces of Fribourg. 
 September 18 – Emperor Go-Murakami accedes to the throne of Japan.
 September 24 (or 28) – Simone Boccanegra is elected, as the first Doge of Genoa.

 Date unknown 
 Shams-ud-Din Shah Mir, having defeated Kota Rani, Hindu queen regnant of Kashmir, in battle at Jayapur (modern Sumbal), asks her to marry him, but she commits suicide rather than do so; thus he takes over sole rule of Kashmir, beginning the Muslim Shah Mir Dynasty.
 All streets in the city of Florence are paved, the first European city in post-Roman times where this has happened.
 The Moscow Kremlin is first referred to as a kremlin.

Births 
 July 23 – Louis I, Duke of Anjou (d. 1384)
 November 1 – Rudolf IV, Duke of Austria (d. 1365)
 date unknown
 Pope Alexander V, Antipope (d. 1410)
 Erik Magnusson, king of parts of Sweden 1356–1359 (d. 1359)
 Frederick, Duke of Bavaria-Landshut (d. 1393)
 Pope Innocent VII (d. 1406)
 John IV, Duke of Brittany (d. 1399)
 Juana Manuel of Castile, queen consort of Castile (d. 1381)
 Ali ibn Mohammed al-Jurjani, Persian Arab encyclopaedist (d. 1414)

Deaths 

 February 17 – Otto, Duke of Austria (b. 1301)
 May 26 – Aldona Ona, Queen of Poland (b. c. 1309)
 August 16 – Azzone Visconti, founder of the state of Milan (b. 1302)
 August 25 – Henry de Cobham, 1st Baron Cobham (b. 1260)
 September 1 – Henry XIV, Duke of Bavaria (b. 1305)
 September 19 – Emperor Go-Daigo of Japan (b. 1288)
 October 29 – Grand Prince Aleksandr Mikhailovich of Tver (b. 1301)

References